Lee Irwin Fisher (born August 7, 1951) is an American attorney, politician, and academic. A member of the Democratic Party, he served as the 64th lieutenant governor of Ohio, with Governor Ted Strickland, from 2007 until 2011. He has served as the Dean of the Cleveland State University College of Law since 2017.

Early life and education
Fisher graduated from Oberlin College in 1973 and earned a Juris Doctor from the Case Western Reserve University School of Law in 1976. He graduated from the Weatherhead School of Management Professional Fellows Program in 1996. In 2004, he received his master's degree in nonprofit organization from the Case Western Reserve University Mandel Center for Nonprofit Organizations.

Career 
After graduation from law school, he was a law clerk for Judge Paul C. Weick of the U.S. Court of Appeals for the Sixth Circuit (1976–1977). In 1978, he joined the Cleveland law firm of Hahn Loeser & Parks LLP, and was an instructor in Legal Research, Writing, and Advocacy at Cleveland State University Cleveland-Marshall College of Law during the 1978 school year. During his 10 years in the state legislature, he continued to serve as of counsel to the law firm (1978–1990). He rejoined Hahn Loeser & Parks as a partner in 1995 and served as a partner until he was selected CEO of the Center for Families and Children in 1999.

Ohio House of Representatives 
At the age of 29, Fisher was elected to the Ohio House of Representatives in 1980. He served as a state representative for two years before being elected to the Ohio Senate in 1982. He was named " Outstanding Freshman Legislator" by Columbus Monthly magazine in 1982. He served as a state senator for eight years. In 1983 he was named a Chase Public Leadership Fellow and attended the Harvard Program for Senior Executives in State and Local Government.

Attorney general 
Fisher was elected Attorney General of Ohio in 1990, defeating Paul Pfeifer in the only statewide election in Ohio history to trigger a statewide recount. In 1992, Fisher was elected a presidential elector for Ohio. Fisher served as attorney general from 1991 to 1995, narrowly losing his bid for re-election in 1994 to Republican Betty Montgomery.

Lieutenant governor 
Joining the ticket of Democratic gubernatorial candidate Ted Strickland, Fisher was elected lieutenant governor in 2006. The Ohio gubernatorial campaign was captured in the 2008 documentary film Swing State, which was directed by (his son) Jason Zone-Fisher, John Intrater, and H. Spencer Young.

2010 U.S. Senate campaign

In February 2009, Fisher announced his campaign to replace George Voinovich in the U.S. Senate.

On May 4, 2010, Fisher won the Democratic primary for the U.S. Senate, defeating Ohio Secretary of State Jennifer Brunner.

In the general election on November 2, 2010, Fisher faced the Republican nominee, Rob Portman, a former Cincinnati congressman and Bush administration official. Portman received 57% of the votes to Fisher's 39%. Fisher carried only six of Ohio's 88 counties and three of 18 congressional districts.

Other work 
In 1998, Fisher ran for governor but lost to Republican Bob Taft, 50%–45%, in the closest gubernatorial election in 28 years.

He has served on two public company boards: Rex Stores (now Rex American Resources) and Office Max (before it was sold to Boise Cascade).

Cleveland State University College of Law
In 2016, Fisher was appointed Interim Dean of Cleveland State University's Cleveland–Marshall College of Law (now the Cleveland State University College of Law) for the 2016–17 academic year. On May 3, 2017, Fisher was named permanent Dean after a national search. His selection was somewhat unconventional as the search committee opted for someone without a history in academia.

During his time as Dean, Fisher has focused on a number of initiatives. These have included a focus on leadership in the law, establishing the Cleveland-Marshall Hall of Fame, increased fundraising, and raising the school's national profile. Beginning in the fall of 2018, Fisher began teaching a course on leadership. That same year, the CM-Law P. Kelly Tompkins Leadership and Law Program was established. Named after P. Kelly Tompkins, a benefactor and 1981 graduate, the program places an emphasis on leadership as a necessary component of law.

In the fall of 2017, Fisher led the effort in establishing the Cleveland-Marshall Hall of Fame. The now-annual fundraiser honors members of the CM-Law community who have had a positive impact on the school either through their reputation or as benefactors. Honorees include Ohio Supreme Court Chief Justice Maureen O'Connor, Congresswoman Marcia Fudge, and former Cleveland Mayor Carl B. Stokes among others. In addition to notable alum, the CM-Law Hall of Fame also highlights those who have been benefactors that have not graduated from the school including federal Judge Dan Polster and Judy and Robert H. Rawson, Jr.

Personal life 
He is married to Peggy Zone Fisher, the president and CEO of the Diversity Center of Northeast Ohio. He has two adult children.

Electoral history 

Write-in and minor candidate notes: In 2006, James Lundeen received 579 votes and Larry Bays received 73 votes.

References

External links 
Ohio Lt. Governor Lee Fisher official government site
Lee Fisher for U.S. Senate official campaign site
 
1996, 1998 campaign contributions at the National Institute for Money in State Politics (Attorney General, Governor)
2010 campaign contributions at OpenSecrets.org

1951 births
Living people
20th-century American lawyers
20th-century American politicians
21st-century American lawyers
21st-century American politicians
1992 United States presidential electors
American university and college faculty deans
Candidates in the 2010 United States elections
Case Western Reserve University School of Law alumni
Cleveland State University people
Deans of law schools in the United States
Lieutenant Governors of Ohio
Democratic Party members of the Ohio House of Representatives
Oberlin College alumni
Ohio Attorneys General
Democratic Party Ohio state senators
Politicians from Ann Arbor, Michigan
Politicians from Shaker Heights, Ohio
State cabinet secretaries of Ohio